Juanita N. Holmes  is an American police officer and administrator who is the Chief of the Training Bureau in the NYPD. Before the appointment of Keechant Sewell as New York City Police Commissioner on January 1, 2022, Holmes was the highest-ranking female in the NYPD.

The Patrol Services Bureau is the largest and most visible bureau in the NYPD, overseeing much of the department's uniformed officers on patrol.

Career
Holmes started her career in law enforcement when she joined the NYPD's 101st Precinct, on patrol. She also served in the 81, 100, 103, 111, and 113 Precincts, also Police Service Areas 2 and 8, the Patrol Borough Bronx Investigations Unit, Housing Borough Bronx/Queens, Office of the Deputy Commissioner of Training, Domestic Violence Unit, and School Safety Division.

As the Commanding Officer of the Patrol Services Bureau, she oversees the department's 77 Precincts throughout the city.

Education
Holmes holds a Bachelor of Science degree in biology from St. Joseph's College (Brooklyn/Patchogue, New York), and is also a graduate of the Police Management Institute at Columbia University.

Dates of rank
Sworn in as a Patrolwoman - 1987   Promoted to Sergeant – 1995  Promoted to Lieutenant - 2002  Promoted to Captain - 2007   Promoted to Deputy Inspector - 2009  Promoted to Inspector 2012 Promoted to Deputy Chief - 2014  Promoted to Assistant Chief - 2016  Promoted to Chief of Patrol - 2020

 Reassigned to Chief of Training - 2022

References

External links
 
 

 New York City Police Department officers
 Living people
 Columbia University alumni
 Year of birth missing (living people)